The Impossible Kid may refer to:
 The Impossible Kid (album), a 2016 album by Aesop Rock
 The Impossible Kid (film), a 1982 film